Canada is a country in North America.

Canada may also refer to:

Buildings and structures
Canada Dock, Liverpool, a dock on the River Mersey and part of the Port of Liverpool
Canada House, the Canadian High Commission in London
Canada House (Berlin), a diplomatic and office building in Berlin, primary home of the embassy of Canada to Germany
Canada House, Manchester, an office building and former packing warehouse in Manchester, England
Canada House, Sheffield, an office building in Sheffield, England
Canada Square, a square on Canary Wharf, Docklands, London
Canada Square (Toronto), three interconnected office buildings located in Toronto
Canada Water, an area in south-east London around the former Canada Dock of the Surrey Commercial Docks
Canada or Kanada warehouses, Auschwitz, storage facilities in Auschwitz for looted property 
Observatorio de La Cañada, a private observatory in Spain

Music
Canada (band), an American indie folk-pop band
Canada (album), by Barb Jungr and Michael Parker
"Canada" (1967 song), also known as "The Centennial Song", written to celebrate Canada's centennial
"Canada", a 2002 song by Low
"Canada" (Pilot song), a 1976 song by 1970s Scottish band Pilot
"C-A-N-A-D-A", a song by Raffi from the album Bananaphone
"Canada", a 2020 song by Australian band Violent Soho from the album Everything Is A-OK
"Canada", a 2020 song by Lauv and Alessia Cara from the album How I'm Feeling

People
Canada (surname)
Canada Lee (1907–1952), an American actor who pioneered roles for African-Americans

Places

Antarctica
Canada Glacier

Australia
Canada Bay, an estuarine bay on the Parramatta River, in the inner-west of Sydney

Canada (historical)
Canada (New France), a French colony along the St. Lawrence River
The Canadas, two British colonies:
Lower Canada
Upper Canada
The united Province of Canada, formed from Lower and Upper Canada, which were renamed Canada East and Canada West, respectively
Republic of Canada, a short-lived rebellious entity

United Kingdom
Canada, Hampshire, a settlement in the parish encompassing Wellow

United States
Canada, Kansas, an unincorporated community
Canada, Kentucky, an unincorporated community
Little Canada (term), a term for French Canadian communities in the United States

West Bank
Canada Park, a national park in the West Bank

Transportation
 Canada (ship), the name for numerous ships
 45553 Canada, a British LMS Jubilee Class locomotive
 Canada (LB&SCR no. 47), a London, Brighton and South Coast Railway B4 class 4-4-0 tender locomotive
 LNER Class A4 4489 Dominion of Canada, a London and North Eastern Railway 4-6-2 tender locomotive

Other uses
Government of Canada, the corporation responsible for the federal administration of Canada
Canada (unit), an ancient Portuguese unit of liquid volume
Canada, a character from the anime Hetalia: Axis Powers
Canada (novel), a novel by Richard Ford published in 2012
Canada, a wasp genus in the subfamily Pteromalinae
The Canada goose
Canada (company), a Spanish visual content production company
Compagnie du Canada, a French colonial syndicate having a fur trading monopoly in the former French colony of Canada in French North America of New France

See also

"O Canada", Canada's national anthem
Canadas (disambiguation)
Cañada (disambiguation)
Canadia (disambiguation)
Canadian (disambiguation)
Canadien
Canadiana
Upper Canada (disambiguation)
Kanada (disambiguation)
Kaneda, a Japanese surname
Kanata (disambiguation)
Kannada (disambiguation)